Charles Meunier (18 June 1903 – 17 February 1971) was a Belgian cyclist. He finished third in the 1928 Paris–Roubaix and won the race the following year.

References

External links

1903 births
1971 deaths
Belgian male cyclists
Sportspeople from Charleroi
Cyclists from Hainaut (province)